The Renault 438, a.k.a. Coupe Deutsch 1934  was a specially developed racing engine, designed and built in France, for use in aircraft competing in the Coupe Deutsch de la Meurthe aircraft races.

Design and development
Following closely the developments with the 6P and 6Q, the 438 married a turbo-supercharger with narrow bore high compression cylinders and the crankcase design of the 6Q

Operational history
Only two aircraft types, both one-offs, are known to have used the 438 engine. One was F-AMVA, a  Caudron C.430/1 Rafale, for racing and record attempts, particularly the Coupe Deutsch de la Meurthe races, the other Hanriot H.183 F-AOJG, an aerobatic version of the Hanriot H.180.

Applications
 Caudron C.430/1 Rafale
 Hanriot H.183

Specifications (438)

References

1930s aircraft piston engines
438